Paul-Peter Tak  is an immunologist and academic specialising in the fields of rheumatology and immunology. In addition to academic research, he served as an executive of several pharmaceutical companies.

Life and career 
Tak graduated as a doctor of medicine from the Free University of Amsterdam and began his medical career as a practitioner in the Bronovo Hospital, The Hague. He joined Leiden University Medical Centre as a Fellow in Internal Medicine in 1990 and was awarded a Fellowship in Rheumatology in 1995. Tak received his PhD from the University of Leiden in 1996 for his thesis Immunohistologic studies of rheumatoid synovial tissue. 

Tak has studied the role of the vagus nerve in chronic inflammation, work which provided the basis for clinical trials exploring bioelectronics as a novel therapeutic approach in rheumatoid arthritis patients. He is also known for his studies on synovial biopsy and synovial tissue analysis. In his academic life, Tak has been Visiting Professor, William Harvey Research Institute (London), Honorary Senior Visiting Fellow (University of Cambridge), Honorary Professor of Rheumatology (Ghent University) and was elected a Fellow of the Academy of Medical Sciences (U.K.) in 2016. 

His was elected by peers as "Best Rheumatologist" in the Netherlands in 2011, and received the Medal of Honour of the Netherlands Society for Rheumatology the same year. He was rated as one of the world’s top 3 doctors in the field of rheumatoid arthritis by Expertscape in 2014.

Tak was chief executive at Tempero Pharmaceutical, which was acquired by GlaxoSmithKline, then served as chief immunology officer at Kintai Therapeutics. In December 2020, Tak became president and CEO of Candel Therapeutics.

Publications
Tak has an h-index of 135 according to Google Scholar. His publications include:

References 

Year of birth missing (living people)
Living people
Vrije Universiteit Amsterdam alumni
Leiden University alumni
Biotechnologists
Dutch immunologists
Fellows of the Academy of Medical Sciences (United Kingdom)